The 2019–20 season was SV Werder Bremen's 121st season in existence and the club's 39th consecutive season in the top flight of German football. In addition to the domestic league, Werder Bremen participated in this season's edition of the DFB-Pokal. The season was slated to cover a period from 1 July 2019 to 30 June 2020. It was extended extraordinarily beyond 30 June due to the COVID-19 pandemic in Germany.

Players

Current squad

Players out on loan

Friendly matches

Competitions

Overview

Bundesliga

League table

Results summary

Results by round

Matches
The Bundesliga schedule was announced on 28 June 2019.

Relegation play-offs
As a result of their 16th-place finish in the regular season, the club qualified for the play-off match with the third-place team in the 2019–20 2. Bundesliga to determine whether the club would remain in the 2020–21 Bundesliga.

DFB-Pokal

Statistics

Appearances and goals

|-
! colspan=14 style=background:#dcdcdc; text-align:center| Goalkeepers

|-
! colspan=14 style=background:#dcdcdc; text-align:center| Defenders

|-
! colspan=14 style=background:#dcdcdc; text-align:center| Midfielders

|-
! colspan=14 style=background:#dcdcdc; text-align:center| Forwards

|-
! colspan=14 style=background:#dcdcdc; text-align:center| Players transferred out during the season

|-

Notes

References

External links

SV Werder Bremen seasons
SV Werder Bremen